Witsand Solar Desalination Plant (WSDP) is a water purification project under construction in South Africa.

Location
The water treatment facility is under construction in the seaside town of Witsand, in Hessequa Local Municipality, in the Western Cape Province, at the mouth of the Breede River.

Overview
The town of Witsand is a tourist attraction, with a low-season population of approximately 300 people. During the tourist high-season, the population swells to over 3,000 people, leading to freshwater scarcity in the town. To address that scarcity, the government of the Western Cape and the French government, decided to jointly develop and fund he Witsand water purification project.

Technology
The WSDP is the first desalination plant in South Africa, that uses solar energy to power its processes. Its new technology applications, allow for the elimination of storage batteries in the design. The plant's new Osmosun technology, involves the use of a specialized "intelligent" membrane that is able to continue delivering reverse osmosis, even when the sun goes behind a cloud, thus reducing the amount of solar energy delivered. The energy delivered would increase again when the clouds moved away. That ability to "soften" the variability in the energy delivered, preserves the reverse osmosis membrane. At night, when there is no sun, the design allows the plant to switch to conventional grid-electricity and continue working all through the darkness, until the sun rises the next morning.

Construction and cost
The budgeted cost of the plant is ZAR:8.6 million (approx. US$650,000), to be shared equally between the governments of the Western Cape and that of France. The unit cost of the purified water at this plant is between ZAR:7 to ZAR:8 (US$0.52 to US$0.60) for every . In comparison, the temporary diesel-fueled desalination plant at Strandfontein, in Cape Town, produces potable water at ZAR:35 to ZAR:40 (US$2.62 to US$3.00) for every 1,000 liters. If this project is a success, it might be reproduced in other parts of the country, where drought is a problem.

Challenges
In order to generate enough solar energy for its internal processes, the plant needs  to accommodate the requisite solar panels. This requirement for large areas to install solar panels, may restrict the project's reproducibility in crowded cities like Cape Town.

See also
 Desalination plants
 Erongo Desalination Plant

References

External links
Special Report: Water Crisis As at 23 July 2018.

Buildings and structures in South Africa
Water resources management
2018 establishments in South Africa
Economy of the Western Cape
Garden Route District Municipality